Chauncey "C.J." Gardner-Johnson (born December 20, 1997) is an American football safety for the Detroit Lions of the National Football League (NFL). He played college football at the University of Florida and was drafted by the New Orleans Saints in the fourth round of the 2019 NFL draft. He has also previously played for the Philadelphia Eagles.

College career
As a true freshman at Florida, Gardner-Johnson appeared in all 14 games, making starts in the final 7 games of the season.  During the 2017 Outback Bowl, Gardner-Johnson had 2 tackles and 2 interceptions, one of which was returned for a touchdown. He was named the MVP of the Outback Bowl. During his sophomore season, Gardner-Johnson started in all 11 games. Before his junior season, Gardner-Johnson was moved to the nickelback position.  On November 26, 2018, Gardner-Johnson announced that he would forgo his final year of eligibility and declare for the 2019 NFL Draft.

Professional career

New Orleans Saints

2019
Gardner-Johnson was drafted by the New Orleans Saints in the fourth round (105th overall) of the 2019 NFL Draft.
In a Week 13 game against the Atlanta Falcons on Thanksgiving Day, Gardner-Johnson recorded his first career interception off a pass thrown by Matt Ryan in the 26–18 win.
In Week 16 against the Tennessee Titans, Gardner-Johnson recorded 8 tackles and forced a fumble on wide receiver Kalif Raymond which he recovered during the 38–28 win.

2020

On October 11, 2020, Gardner-Johnson was punched by teammate Michael Thomas during practice. This led to Thomas being benched for that week's game. On November 1, 2020, in a 26–23 victory over the Chicago Bears, Gardner-Johnson was sucker-punched by Bears' wide receiver Javon Wims which led to a scuffle between both teams in the third quarter. Wims ran up to an unsuspecting Gardner-Johnson, who had his back turned and punched him in the helmet. When Gardner-Johnson did not react, Wims punched him again. Earlier broadcast showed Gardner-Johnson ripping off Wims' mouthguard away from Wims. Despite Wims claiming Gardner-Johnson spit on him, no evidence supported this claim. Gardner-Johnson later denied that he spit on Wims. The incident led to Wims being ejected from the game and suspended for two games by the NFL the next day. Gardner-Johnson was also fined $5,128 for his actions with Wims.

In Week 10 against the San Francisco 49ers, Gardner-Johnson recorded his first career sack on quarterback Nick Mullens during the 27–13 win. In Week 12 against the Denver Broncos, Gardner-Johnson intercepted a pass thrown by wide receiver Kendall Hinton during the 31–3 win. Gardner-Johnson was placed on the reserve/COVID-19 list by the Saints on December 30, 2020, and activated on January 8, 2021.

On January 10, 2021, in the NFC Wildcard game against the Chicago Bears, Gardner-Johnson was involved in a scuffle with another Bears receiver, Anthony Miller. Miller was ejected for the fight while they both received unsportsmanlike conduct penalties.

2021

Gardner-Johnson entered 2021 as a starting safety. He started seven games before being placed on injured reserve on November 13. He was activated on December 11. In a game at the Tampa Bay Buccaneers on December 19, 2021, Gardner-Johnson intercepted Tom Brady's pass intended for Scotty Miller late in the game to close out the 9–0 shutout victory.

Philadelphia Eagles

2022
On August 30, 2022, the Saints traded Gardner-Johnson along with a 2025 seventh-round pick to the Philadelphia Eagles for a fifth-round pick and the lower of their two sixth-round picks in the 2024 NFL Draft. He started the first 11 games before suffering a lacerated kidney in Week 12. He was placed on injured reserve on December 3, 2022, leading the league in interceptions. He was activated from injured reserve on January 7, 2023. Gardner-Johnson helped the Eagles reach Super Bowl LVII. In the Super Bowl, Gardner-Johnson recorded 4 tackles in the Eagles 38-35 loss to the Kansas City Chiefs.

Detroit Lions
On March 20, 2023, the Lions signed Gardner-Johnson.

Personal life
Gardner-Johnson was known as Chauncey Gardner Jr. in his first two seasons with Florida. For his junior year, he changed the name on his jersey to Gardner-Johnson in honor of his stepfather, Brian Johnson.  Gardner-Johnson's biological father, Chauncey Gardner Sr., has been a part of his life, but Johnson had raised Gardner-Johnson from the time he was a toddler.

References

External links
Philadelphia Eagles bio
Florida Gators bio

1997 births
Living people
People from Cocoa, Florida
Players of American football from Florida
American football defensive backs
Florida Gators football players
New Orleans Saints players
Philadelphia Eagles players
Detroit Lions players